

Gallery 

The Bordeaux Railway Bridge is a railway bridge on the Canadian Pacific Railway line across the Rivière des Prairies between Ahuntsic-Cartierville, on Montreal Island, and Laval-des-Rapides, Laval, Quebec, Canada. This bridge is used by freight trains of the Canadian Pacific Railway (CPR), the Chemins de Fer Québec-Gatineau (CFQG) and by the Saint-Jerome line suburban trains of the Réseau de transport métropolitain (RTM).

A four-rail  →gauntlet track is still in use on this bridge because the horizontal structure gauge is not sufficiently wide for a regular double track.

Greenbridge 
A recently renovated/rebuilt bicycle/pedestrian bridge is cantilevered on the upstream side of this bridge. https://www.velo.qc.ca/

See also
 List of bridges in Canada
 List of bridges spanning the Rivière des Prairies
 List of bridges in Montreal
 List of crossings of the Rivière des Prairies
 Route Verte 1 & 2
 Vélo Québec

References

External links
 
 Quebec Gatineau Railway (QGR)
 Île Perry

Ahuntsic-Cartierville
Bridges in Laval, Quebec
Bridges in Montreal
Canadian Pacific Railway bridges in Canada
Railway bridges in Quebec
Rivière des Prairies
Truss bridges in Canada